The 2012 Campeonato da Primeira Divisão de Futebol Profissional da FGF (2012 FGF First Division Professional Football Championship), better known as the 2012 Campeonato Gaúcho or  Gaúcho, was the 92nd edition of the top flight football league of the Brazilian state of Rio Grande do Sul. The season began on 18 January and ended on 13 May. Internacional successfully defended its 2011 title in the final by defeating Caxias.

Format
The sixteen clubs were divided into two groups, such that each team would play two matches to determine which four teams from each group would qualify to the play-offs, and which teams would be relegated. The first stage, called Taça Piratini 2012 (Piratini Cup 2012, won by Internacional), had each team from one group play one team in the other group. In the second stage, called Taça Farroupilha 2012 (Farroupilha Cup 2012, won by Grêmio) each team within each group played one match against another team in the same group. The two lowest ranked teams in the overall standings were relegated (Ypiranga and Avenida).

Teams

Taça Piratini

First stage

Group A standings

Group B standings

Playoffs

Taça Farroupilha

First stage

Group A standings

Group B standings

Playoffs

Tournament Finals

Internacional won 3–2 on aggregate.

Overall table
The overall table considered only the matches played during the first stage of both group's Taças and would define the two teams that to be relegated for the 2013 season. The Taça Champions are ranked at the top of the table. The best placed team not playing in Campeonato Brasileiro Série A  (Grêmio, Internacional), B or C (Caxias) was promoted to 2012 Campeonato Brasileiro Série D. The best three teams not qualified to 2013 Copa Libertadores qualified for 2013 Copa do Brasil.

See also
2012 Copa FGF

References

External links
Federação Gaúcha de Futebol

Campeonato Gaúcho seasons
Gaucho